Antonio Maria Giovinazzi (born 14 December 1993) is an Italian racing driver who currently serves as the reserve driver for Scuderia Ferrari, Haas and Alfa Romeo Racing. He was the 2015 FIA Formula 3 European Championship runner-up and raced with Prema in the 2016 GP2 Series, again finishing runner-up with five wins and eight overall podiums. He made his competitive debut for Sauber at the 2017 Australian Grand Prix, replacing the injured Pascal Wehrlein. He also replaced Wehrlein at the following Chinese Grand Prix as Wehrlein continued his recovery. Giovinazzi raced in F1 for Alfa Romeo Racing from 2019 to 2021.

Early career

Karting
Giovinazzi began karting in 2000. In 2006, he became the champion in the Italian National Trophy 60cc and Euro Trophy 60 championships. He was champion of the WSK Master Series in the KF2 class in both 2010 and 2011.

Formula Pilota China
Giovinazzi began his single seater career by competing in Formula Pilota China in 2012. He finished as the overall champion in his debut season with a total of six wins. He also raced for the BVM team in the last round of the 2012 Formula Abarth season at Monza. Despite winning two races and finishing in second place in one, he did not receive any points since he was a guest driver.

Formula Three
Giovinazzi competed in the 2013 British Formula Three Championship season with the Double R Racing team, alongside Sean Gelael and Tatiana Calderón. He won two races, at Silverstone and at Spa-Francorchamps, and ended the season as runner-up behind Jordan King. During the season, Giovinazzi entered the 2013 Masters of Formula 3, finishing the race in 10th place.

In 2013, Giovinazzi made his debut in the FIA Formula 3 European Championship with the Double R Racing team. He scored his first points at the fourth round in Brands Hatch, finishing 11th in the first race. His best result of the season was at the final race in Hockenheim, where he finished 6th. Giovinazzi ended the season in 15th place in the championship with 45 points.

In 2014, Giovinazzi signed with Jagonya Ayam with Carlin to compete in the 2014 FIA Formula 3 European Championship season. His first Formula 3 podium came with a 2nd-place finish in Hockenheim. His first win came from pole position at the Red Bull Ring, before adding another win at the following round at the Nürburgring. He ended the season in 6th place in the standings with 238 points, recording two wins, seven podium finishes, two pole positions and three fastest laps.

Giovinazzi continued in the championship with Jagonya Agam with Carlin in 2015, in a field which included future Formula One competitors Charles Leclerc, Lance Stroll, George Russell and Alexander Albon. He was a championship contender for much of the season, eventually losing out to Felix Rosenqvist. Giovinazzi ended the season as the championship runner-up, with 412.5 points. He recorded six wins, twenty podium finishes, four pole positions and four fastest laps. During the 2015 season he made his second appearance at the Masters of Formula 3 race, winning the race after starting from 2nd on the grid.

After the end of his European Formula 3 season, Giovinazzi entered the non-championship 2015 Macau Grand Prix with Carlin, qualifying in 4th place. In the qualifying race, he caused a multi-car pile up on the first lap after colliding with Daniel Juncadella. Giovinazzi went on to win the qualifying race, but was later handed a 20-second penalty for the incident, demoting him to 10th. At the main event, he recovered to finish in 4th place.

Deutsche Tourenwagen Masters
Giovinazzi had impressed Audi Sport Team Phoenix during a DTM test in 2015, before being called up to replace the suspended Timo Scheider for the round at Moscow Raceway during the 2015 DTM season. He finished the races in 19th and 21st.

Endurance racing
In 2016, Giovinazzi took part in the Asian Le Mans Series in the LMP2 class alongside Sean Gelael. They entered the final two rounds at Buriram and Sepang, winning both races. Giovinazzi then entered the Silverstone round of the European Le Mans Series alongside Gelael and Mitch Evans for SMP Racing, in which they came 5th.

In the FIA World Endurance Championship, Giovinazzi took part in the 2016 6 Hours of Fuji alongside Gelael and Giedo van der Garde for the Extreme Speed Motorsports team, in which they finished 4th in the LMP2 class. He then took part in the following round in Shanghai alongside Gelael and Tom Blomqvist, finishing 2nd.

He took part at the 2018 24 Hours of Le Mans driving a Ferrari 488 GTE for AF Corse Ferrari factory team alongside Toni Vilander and Pipo Derani. He finished the race 5th in GTE category.

For 2023, Giovinazzi was named as one of Ferrari's factory drivers for their Hypercar program in the 2023 FIA World Endurance Championship.

GP2 Series

Giovinazzi joined the series with Prema Powerteam for the 2016 season alongside Red Bull Junior and 2014 Formula Renault 3.5 Series runner-up Pierre Gasly.

After a poor start by finishing outside the points and losing reverse grid pole in the first two rounds, Giovinazzi scored victories in both the feature and sprint races in Baku, becoming the first driver to do 'the double' since Davide Valsecchi in 2012.

Giovinazzi took pole position from his teammate Gasly at Spa, and won the Sprint Race after Gasly had won the feature race on Saturday. At Monza, he took pole position, but was disqualified from the session due to a technical infringement. Despite starting from the back of the grid, he won in the Feature Race after a mix up involving the safety car that worked in his favour.

Giovinazzi took the lead of the championship at Sepang by overtaking Sergey Sirotkin late on for his 5th win of the season. However, Pierre Gasly's victory in the Abu Dhabi feature race meant that Gasly led by 12 points into the final race. Giovinazzi finished the final race ahead of Gasly as Alex Lynn won the race, however, after making a poor start, he was unable to overturn the 12-point gap, and Gasly won the championship by 8 points.

Had Giovinazzi won the championship, he would have been the first rookie champion since Nico Hülkenberg in 2009.

Formula One career
On 5 September 2016, it was announced that Giovinazzi would perform simulator work for Scuderia Ferrari. In December, he was confirmed as Ferrari's third driver.

Race debut as reserve and test driver (2017–2018) 

Giovinazzi participated in pre-season testing for the  season with Sauber. Wehrlein did not feel fit enough for a complete race distance due to his training deficit as a result of a crash at the 2017 Race of Champions. Giovinazzi finished 12th on his debut. His debut meant he was the first Italian driver to start a Formula One race since Jarno Trulli and Vitantonio Liuzzi at the 2011 Brazilian Grand Prix.

Giovinazzi later participated in seven free practice sessions for the Haas F1 Team over the course of the 2017 season. He took part in six free practice sessions for Sauber during the season.

Alfa Romeo (2019–2021)

2019

Giovinazzi drove for Alfa Romeo during the  season, partnering Kimi Räikkönen and replacing Marcus Ericsson, who became the team's reserve driver.

It was the first points finish for an Italian driver in Formula One since Vitantonio Liuzzi finished sixth at the 2010 Korean Grand Prix. The next race in Britain saw his first retirement of the season, after a mechanical problem caused him to spin out into a gravel trap. It later emerged that the crash caused Alfa Romeo to consider Giovinazzi's future with the team, with team principal Frédéric Vasseur saying "We had a tough discussion with Antonio, because these kind of things can decide your career. We were thinking about the future." At this stage of the season, Giovinazzi had collected one point, whilst teammate Räikkönen had scored 31.

The second half of the season was more successful for Giovinazzi. He claimed points a week after the Belgian Grand Prix with a ninth-place finish at his first home race in Formula One. It was the first time he had led a Formula One Grand Prix race in his career. For Alfa Romeo, it was the first time since Andrea de Cesaris led in the 1983 Belgian Grand Prix. Giovinazzi ultimately finished 10th, scoring points for the second consecutive race. Giovinazzi ended the season in 17th place in the championship with 14 points.

2020

Giovinazzi and Räikkönen were retained by Alfa Romeo for the  season.

Giovinazzi scored points at the first race of the season in Austria, qualifying 18th but finishing ninth after nine other cars retired from the race. A stray wheel from his car hit the Williams of George Russell, causing both to retire from the race. He was involved in a high-speed accident at the  during the safety car restart, in which four cars were eliminated from the race. He went on to retire from the race with gearbox problems.

Giovinazzi ended the season in 17th place in the drivers' championship. He scored four points, the same number as teammate Räikkönen, however Räikkönen placed above Giovinazzi by virtue of having more ninth-placed finishes. Giovinazzi outqualified Räikkönen at nine of the season's 17 races.

2021

Giovinazzi and Räikkönen were retained by Alfa Romeo for the  season. He finished the race in 10th place, scoring Alfa Romeo's first point of the season. He would follow this up with eleventh in Azerbaijan.

Giovinazzi left Alfa Romeo at the end of the 2021 season, and became reserve driver for Ferrari, sharing duties with Mick Schumacher. As part of his 2021 contract, he also acted as a reserve driver for Ferrari's customer teams, Alfa Romeo and Haas.

Tests with Ferrari and Alpine, free practices with Haas (2022–present) 
In September 2022, Giovinazzi participated in a test at the Fiorano circuit with the Ferrari SF21 together with the Russian-Israeli driver Robert Shwartzman, in order to prepare them both for free practice sessions throughout the season.

Giovinazzi is a test driver for Haas in 2022, and competed in free practice sessions at the Italian and United States Grands Prix for the team, though in the latter session the Italian could only run four laps before crashing and would not take further part in that practice. He later apologised to his team for the mistake., He took part in a test session with Alpine at the Hungaroring in late September, alongside Nyck de Vries and Jack Doohan.

Giovinazzi retained his reserve roles with Ferrari for 2023 alongside his main campaign in the World Endurance Championship.

Formula E 

After losing his full-time Formula One seat in 2021, Giovinazzi was signed by Dragon Penske Autosport to drive alongside Sérgio Sette Câmara in the 2021–22 Formula E World Championship. He was ruled out of the final race in Seoul due to a thumb injury, caused by contact with Alexander Sims. Giovinazzi finished 23rd in the championship with no points, being the only full-time driver to fail to score points. Giovinazzi left the team as they rebranded to DS Penske, with Stoffel Vandoorne and Jean-Éric Vergne replacing him and teammate Sette Câmara for the 2022-23 season.

Karting record

Karting career summary

Racing record

Racing career summary 

† As Giovinazzi was a guest driver, he was ineligible for points.
* Season still in progress.

Single seater racing results

Complete Formula Pilota China results 
(key) (Races in bold indicate pole position) (Races in italics indicate fastest lap)

Complete FIA Formula 3 European Championship results
(key) (Races in bold indicate pole position) (Races in italics indicate fastest lap)

† Driver did not finish the race, but was classified as he completed over 90% of the race distance.

Complete Macau Grand Prix results

Complete GP2 Series results
(key) (races in bold indicate pole position) (races in italics indicate fastest lap)

Complete Formula One results
(key) (Races in bold indicate pole position; races in italics indicate fastest lap)

† Did not finish, but was classified as driver had completed more than 90% of the race distance.

Complete Formula E results
(key) (Races in bold indicate pole position; races in italics indicate fastest lap)

Sports car racing results

Complete European Le Mans Series results

Complete FIA World Endurance Championship results

24 Hours of Le Mans results

Notes

References

External links

 
 

1993 births
Living people
Italian racing drivers
Formula Masters China drivers
Formula Abarth drivers
FIA Formula 3 European Championship drivers
GP2 Series drivers
British Formula Three Championship drivers
Deutsche Tourenwagen Masters drivers
Asian Le Mans Series drivers
Italian Formula One drivers
Sauber Formula One drivers
Alfa Romeo Formula One drivers
24 Hours of Le Mans drivers
People from Martina Franca
Eurasia Motorsport drivers
Double R Racing drivers
Carlin racing drivers
Prema Powerteam drivers
Sportspeople from the Province of Taranto
Formula E drivers
Dragon Racing drivers
AF Corse drivers
FIA World Endurance Championship drivers
BVM Racing drivers
Karting World Championship drivers
Extreme Speed Motorsports drivers
Audi Sport drivers
SMP Racing drivers
Phoenix Racing drivers
Ferrari Competizioni GT drivers